Battle of the Maroons or Battle of Maroons may refer to:

 Battle of the Maroons (Colombo) - Annual cricket match between Ananda College and Nalanda College, Colombo.
 Battle of the Maroons (Kandy) - Annual cricket match between Dharmaraja College and Kingswood College, Kandy.